Balford Farms is an American dairy company located in Burlington, New Jersey. It is the oldest privately-owned and operated independent distributor in the Lehigh Valley region.

Along with their own brands, Balford Farms sells and distributes a wide range of products.

History
Balford Farms was founded in 1892 by a teenager named Frank B. Baldwin, using a horse and wagon to deliver milk to customers throughout Philadelphia, Pennsylvania after school. As his business grew, father Edgar A. Baldwin helped with the management of day-to-day operations and expanded the business into a profitable company called Baldwin Dairies.

In 1965, Baldwin Dairies merged with Frankford Dairies of Philadelphia to become Baldwin-Frankford Dairies, Inc. George H. Baldwin, Sr. and John Baldwin, grandsons of Frank B. Baldwin, changed the name to Balford Farms in 1972.

Expansion of Balford Farms continued in 1980 with the purchase of a 70,000 ft² (6,503 m²) warehouse in Bensalem, Pennsylvania. Over the next few years, the company acquired small independent dairy and food companies to become a major distributor in the Lehigh Valley. Balford Farms merged with another longtime business in Philadelphia, Quality Dairy Products (operating as Breuninger's Dairy) in 1996.

Dairy Farmers of America sold their warehousing and distribution center in Harleysville, Pennsylvania to Balford Farms in 2012, formerly owned by Keller's Creamery, as part of a consolidation project.

The company also acquired Rosenberger's Dairy of Hatfield, Pennsylvania.

Executives
Current corporate executives at Balford Farms:
Laurence E. Bowes — CEO
Larry Walker - President

References

External links
Balford Farms (Official Website)

Logistics
Dairy farming
Burlington, New Jersey
Food and drink companies established in 1892
Food and drink companies based in New Jersey
1892 establishments in Pennsylvania